Reginal Dennis Benjamin Moore (born March 31, 1981) is an American-born Angolan basketball player. A  power forward, he graduated from Oral Roberts University in Tulsa, Oklahoma in 2003. He has played in Norway, United States Basketball League (USBL; under coach John Starks), Germany and Portugal.

In 2012, Moore was granted Angolan citizenship, thus being eligible to play for the Angolan national squad. He is only the second U.S. citizen in the history of the country's existence to ever be granted Angolan nationality.

Achievements
 2012–2013   – BAI Basket 2013 champion with Primeiro de Agosto
 2012–2013   – BAI Basket 2013 Top 3-point shooter
 2011–2012   – Africa Club Champion with Primeiro de Agosto
 2009–2010   – BAI Basket 2010 Top Scorer
 2006 & 2007 – Relegated to the National League with Givate Shmuel
 2005 & 2006 – Voted player of the year in Portugal's TMN
 2005 & 2006 – Led the TMN (Portugal) League in scoring in (22.2 ppg)
 2004 & 2005 – Voted twice to Portugal's All-Star Game
 2003–2004   – Voted 1st Team All-Norwegian League

References

External links
Africabasket profile

1981 births
Living people
2014 FIBA Basketball World Cup players
African Games gold medalists for Angola
African Games medalists in basketball
American expatriate basketball people in Angola
American expatriate basketball people in Germany
American expatriate basketball people in Israel
American expatriate basketball people in Norway
American expatriate basketball people in Portugal
American expatriate basketball people in Spain
American men's basketball players
Angolan men's basketball players
Atlético Petróleos de Luanda basketball players
Basketball players from California
C.D. Primeiro de Agosto men's basketball players
C.R.D. Libolo basketball players
Competitors at the 2015 African Games
Giessen 46ers players
Junior college men's basketball players in the United States
Oral Roberts Golden Eagles men's basketball players
People from Lemoore, California
UB La Palma players
2019 FIBA Basketball World Cup players
Power forwards (basketball)